This is a list of video games featuring various Cartoon Network characters, which are developed, published, or distributed by either sister division Warner Bros. Interactive Entertainment or outside third parties. This list does not include Internet-only games released only on the network's website or mobile apps. Cartoon Network has created several MMOGs between the years 2009-2011. These Cartoon Network MMOGs were all presented under the name Cartoon Network Universe. The largest of these Cartoon Network MMOGs was Cartoon Network Universe: FusionFall which was released in late 2008 (early 2009).

Games

Based on individual shows

Adventure Time
Hey Ice King! Why'd You Steal Our Garbage?!! (2012)
Explore the Dungeon Because I Don't Know! (2013)
Battle Party (2014)
The Secret of the Nameless Kingdom (2014)
Finn & Jake Investigations (2015)
Pirates of the Enchiridion (2018)
Ben 10
Ben 10 (Hyperscan) (2006)
Protector of Earth (2007)
Ben 10: Alien Force
Alien Force (2008)
Vilgax Attacks (2009)
The Rise of Hex (2010)
Ben 10: Ultimate Alien
Cosmic Destruction (2010)
Galactic Racing (2011)
Ben 10: Omniverse
Omniverse (2012)
Omniverse 2 (2013)
Ben 10 (Reboot)
Ben 10 (2017 video game)
Ben 10: Power Trip (2020)
Camp Lazlo
Leaky Lake Games (2006)
Codename: Kids Next Door
Operation: S.O.D.A. (2004)
Operation: V.I.D.E.O.G.A.M.E. (2005)
Dexter's Laboratory
Deesaster Strikes! (2001)
Mandark's Lab?
Robot Rampage
Science Ain't Fair!
Chess Challenge (2002)
Ed, Edd n Eddy
Jawbreakers! (2003)
The Mis-Edventures (2005)
Scam of the Century (2007)
The Flintstones
Bedrock Bowling (2000)
Foster's Home for Imaginary Friends
Foster's Home for Imaginary Friends (2006)
Imagination Invaders (2007)
Generator Rex
Agent of Providence (2011)
The Grim Adventures of Billy & Mandy
The Grim Adventures of Billy & Mandy (2006)
Hi Hi Puffy AmiYumi
Kaznapped! (2005)
The Genie and the Amp (2006)
Johnny Bravo
The Hukka-Mega-Mighty-Ultra-Extreme Date-O-Rama (2009)
OK K.O.! Let's Be Heroes
Let's Play Heroes (2018)
The Powerpuff Girls
Bad Mojo Jojo (2000)
Paint the Townsville Green (2000)
Mojo Jojo's Pet Project (2001)
Battle Him (2001)
Cartoon Snapshot (2001)
Relish Rampage (2002)
Chemical X-Traction
Gamesville
Him & Seek
Mojo Jojo A-Go-Go!
Mojo Jojo's Clone Zone
Princess Snorebucks
Regular Show
Mordecai and Rigby in 8-Bit Land (2013)
Samurai Jack
The Amulet of Time (2003)
The Shadow of Aku (2004)
Samurai Jack: Battle Through Time (2020)
Scooby-Doo
Classic Creep Capers (2000)
The Secret Saturdays
Beasts of the 5th Sun (2009)
Steven Universe
Attack the Light (2015)
Save the Light (2017)
Unleash the Light (2019)
Wacky Races
Wacky Races (2000)
Wacky Races: Starring Dastardly and Muttley (2000/2001)

Based on multiple shows
Cartoon Network 'Toon Jam! (1995; PC game)
Cartoon Network Speedway (2003)
Cartoon Network: Block Party (2004)
Cartoon Network Racing (2006)
Cartoon Network Universe: FusionFall (2009)
Cartoon Network: Punch Time Explosion (2011)
Cartoon Network Universe: Project Exonaut (2011)
Cartoon Network Universe: FusionFall Heroes (2013)
Cartoon Network: Superstar Soccer (2014)
Cartoon Network: Backlot Party (Cancelled; planned for 2015)
Lego Dimensions (2015-17)
Cartoon Network: Battle Crashers (2016)
Cartoon Network Match Land (2018)
MultiVersus (2022)

See also
List of video games based on cartoons
List of The Powerpuff Girls video games

References

External links
Cartoon Network official US gaming site
Cartoon Network official AU gaming site

 List
Video games based on animated television series
Lists of video games based on works
Cartoon Network-related lists
Cartoon Network
2000s-related lists
2010s-related lists
2020s-related lists